MTV's Buzz Bin was a select group of music videos by up and coming artists and bands that the network deemed "buzz worthy", "cutting edge", or "the next big thing". As such, the selected videos received heavy rotation on the channel, and were also featured in special promotional commercials that highlighted the latest Buzz Bin selections, which were sometimes known as Buzz Clips.

The Buzz Bin began in 1987, and featured artists and bands from all genres of music (not just alternative rock or modern rock acts, although those were the majority). Many music industry trade publications have noted the direct effect Buzz Bin selection has had on album sales, with some sources stating that upwards of 75% of the selected acts have gone on to achieve RIAA Gold Certification or better. In 1992, The New York Times noted the Buzz Bin label's power in increasing sales and creating hit songs and Entertainment Weekly called it "Alternative rock's best friend."

In an article published in the journal of Music and Science, Osborn, Rossin, and Weingarten conducted a thorough content analysis of 288 Buzz Clips videos to "assess the kinds of people and cultural practices MTV promoted as buzzworthy in the 1990s." The study found high degrees of correlation between gender ethnicity, instrumentation, and genre: BIPOC musicians' videos were often coded as hip-hop or R&B, featuring drum machines and keyboards; white musicians' videos featured more electric guitars; and women were shown playing instruments with less frequency than men.

The Buzz Bin ended in 2004 and was split in half into MTV's "Discover and Download" and VH1's "You Oughta Know".

MTV released two compilation CDs of Buzz Bin tracks, on Mammoth Records.

Artists featured in the Buzz Bin

#
 10,000 Maniacs
 311
 3rd Bass
 50 Cent

A
 AFI
 Christina Aguilera
 Akon
 The Alarm
 Alice in Chains
 Alien Ant Farm
 The All-American Rejects
 Amerie
 Tori Amos
 Sunshine Anderson
 Andy Prieboy
 Fiona Apple
 Tasmin Archer
 Arrested Development
 At The Drive-In
 The Ataris
 Audioslave
 Aztec Camera

B
 The B-52s
 Erykah Badu
 BBMak
 Beastie Boys
 Beck
 Adrian Belew
 Belly
 Tony Bennett
 Better Than Ezra
 Big Audio Dynamite
 Bingoboys
 Björk
 The Black Eyed Peas
 Blind Melon
 Blink-182
 The Blue Nile
 Blur
 Tracy Bonham
 Brand New
 Brand New Heavies
 The Brandos
 The Breeders
 Edie Brickell & New Bohemians
 Buckcherry
 Jeff Buckley
 Joe Budden
 Bush
 Kate Bush
 Butthole Surfers

C
 Cake
 The Call
 Camouflage
 Camper Van Beethoven
 Cam'ron
 The Cardigans
 Vanessa Carlton
 The Charlatans
 The Chemical Brothers
 Neneh Cherry
 Toni Childs
 Chingy
 The Church
 CIV
 Coheed and Cambria
 Cold
 Coldplay
 Edwyn Collins
 Common
 Concrete Blonde
 Julian Cope
 Cornershop
 Nikka Costa
 Elvis Costello
 Counting Crows
 Cowboy Junkies
 Cracker
 The Cranberries
 Crash Test Dummies
 The Cure
 Mark Curry
 Cypress Hill

D
 D'Angelo
 Terence Trent D'Arby
 Daddy Freddy
 Daft Punk
 The Dandy Warhols
 Danzig
 The Darkness
 Dashboard Confessional
 Dave Matthews Band
 Craig David
 Howie Day
 De La Soul
 Deep Forest
 Definition Of Sound
 Deftones
 Depeche Mode
 dEUS
 Dido
 Dig
 Digable Planets
 Dinosaur Jr.
 Disturbed
 The Divinyls
 DNA
 Fefe Dobson
 Dog's Eye View
 Thomas Dolby
 The Donnas
 Drivin N Cryin
 Drowning Pool
 Bob Dylan
 Ms. Dynamite

E
 Eels
 Elastica
 Elephant Man
 Missy Elliott
 EMF
 Eminem
 Enigma
 Erasure
 Evanescence
 Faith Evans
 Eve
 Eve 6
 Everclear

F
 Fabolous
 Faith No More
 The Farm
 Dionne Farris
 Fastball
 Fatboy Slim
 Bryan Ferry
 Filter
 The Flaming Lips
 Flesh For Lulu
 Folk Implosion
 Foo Fighters
 Forest for the Trees
 Fountains of Wayne
 Franz Ferdinand
 Freestylers
 Frente
 Fuel

G
 Garbage
 Gene Loves Jezebel
 Gin Blossoms
 Allen Ginsberg
 The Godfathers
 Godsmack
 Goo Goo Dolls
 Gorillaz
 David Gray
 Macy Gray
 Green Day
 Guadalcanal Diary

H
 Hanson
 Happy Mondays
 Helmet
 Robyn Hitchcock and the Egyptians
 The Hives
 Hole
 Hoodoo Gurus
 Hot Boys
 The House Of Love
 Hunters & Collectors

I
 Enrique Iglesias
 Natalie Imbruglia
 Incubus
 India.Arie
 Indigo Girls

J
 James
 Jamiroquai
 Jane's Addiction
 Jellyfish
 The Jesus & Mary Chain
 Jesus Jones
 Jimmie's Chicken Shack
 Jimmy Eat World
 Norah Jones
 Junior Senior
 Jurassic 5
 JXL v. Elvis

K
 Kelis
 Alicia Keys
 Kid Rock
 Kina
 King's X
 Kittie
 The KLF
 Lenny Kravitz

L
 The La's
 LaTour
 Avril Lavigne
 The Lemonheads
 Len
 Julian Lennon
 Letters To Cleo
 Glenn Lewis
 The Lightning Seeds
 Lil' Jon
 Lil' Scrappy
 Limp Bizkit
 Linkin Park
 Live
 Living Colour
 The Lo Fidelity Allstars
 Lisa Loeb & Nine Stories
 Jennifer Lopez
 Monie Love
 Love and Rockets
 Lucy Pearl
 Baz Luhrmann
 Kevin Lyttle

M
 Marilyn Manson
 Ziggy Marley and the Melody Makers
 Maroon 5
 Ricky Martin
 John Mayer
 Mazzy Star
 Sarah McLachlan
 Men Without Hats
 M.I.A.
 Midnight Oil
 The Mighty Lemon Drops
 They Might Be Giants
 Mighty Mighty Bosstones
 The Mission UK
 Moby
 Alanis Morissette
 Morrissey
 Bob Mould
 Mudvayne
 Peter Murphy
 Musiq

N
 Nada Surf
 Bif Naked
 Ned's Atomic Dustbin
 New Found Glory
 New Order
 The New Radicals
 Nine Inch Nails
 Nirvana
 No Doubt

O
 Oasis
 Sinead O'Connor
 The Offspring
 Orgy
 Joan Osborne
 Outkast

P
 P.O.D.
 Papa Roach
 Pavement
 Pearl Jam
 Liz Phair
 Pharrell
 P!nk
 The Pixies
 P.M. Dawn
 Iggy Pop
 Porno For Pyros
 Portishead
 Powerman 5000
 The Presidents of the United States of America
 Primal Scream
 Primitive Radio Gods
 The Primitives
 The Prodigy
 Psychedelic Furs
 Public Image Ltd.

Q
 Finley Quaye

R
 R.E.M.
 Radiohead
 Rage Against the Machine
 Rammstein
 Rancid
 Ranking Roger
 Red Hot Chili Peppers
 Lou Reed
 Reef
 The Refreshments
 The Rembrandts
 The Rentals
 The Replacements
 Republica
 Res
 Busta Rhymes
 The Robert Rawson Duet
 Rocket From the Crypt
 The Roots

S
 Scarface
 Jill Scott
 Screaming Blue Messiahs
 Screaming Trees
 Seal
 Erick Sermon, Redman and Keith Murray
 Semisonic
 Shakespears Sister
 Shakira
 Shudder To Think
 Silverchair
 Simple Minds
 Siouxsie and the Banshees
 The Smashing Pumpkins
 Patti Smith
 The Smithereens
 The Smiths
 Jill Sobule
 Social Distortion
 Sonic Youth
 Soul Asylum
 Soundgarden
 The Soup Dragons
 Space Monkeys
 Spacehog
 Spearhead
 Sponge
 Squirrel Nut Zippers
 Stabbing Westward
 Stardust
 Static-X
 Staind
 Stereo MCs
 Stone Temple Pilots
 Story of the Year
 Stroke 9
 The Strokes
 Sublime
 Sugar Ray
 The Sugarcubes
 The Sundays
 Superdrag
 Matthew Sweet
 System of a Down

T
 Taproot
 Teenage Fanclub
 Temple of the Dog
 Terror Squad
 They Might Be Giants
 Carl Thomas
 Thunder
 Thursday
 Toad the Wet Sprocket
 The Toadies
 The Tomato Can Experience
 Tool
 Travis
 Trik Turner
 Tripping Daisy
 Triumph the Insult Comic Dog
 TRUSTcompany
 Tweet
 Twiztid

U
 U2
 Urban Dance Squad
 Urge Overkill
 Us3
 Utah Saints

V
 Veruca Salt
 The Verve
 The Verve Pipe
 The Vines

W
 The Wallflowers
 Crystal Waters
 Wax
 Weezer
 Kanye West
 The White Stripes
 White Trash
 White Zombie
 Robbie Williams
 Wire
 Andrew W.K.
 World Party

X
 XTC

Y
 Yeah Yeah Yeahs
 Pete Yorn

References

External links
Entertainment Weekly review of 'MTV's Best of the Buzz Bin'

MTV
Music videos